Veejay is a free visual instrument and realtime video sampler for Linux released under the GNU General Public License version 2 or later.

Veejay functions as a video tracker and editing tool, as well as a realtime video sequencer and effects generator that allows for live interaction. Additionally, the generated content can be recorded to disk for future use.

Development 

The project was started in June 2002 by Niels Elburg, Matthijs van Henten and Dursun Koca with the objective to provide a tool that would allow the user to play the video like a piano (a visual instrument) and record the resulting video directly to disk (video sampling).

Veejay is not a traditional video editing application; The application aims for a high level of interoperability with other Audio/video applications through the use of Shared resources, Loop devices, various messaging protocols such as Midi, OSC and veejay's internal message system VIMS, but also through supporting third party modules such as Frei0r plugins and frameworks like Pure Data. It offers a wide range of video effects, a Video Keyboard for the video artist, and it offers scripting capabilities for use in (automated) video installations.

Veejay has separated the video processing core from the user interface, allowing the user(s) to control (multiple instances of) the application over the network.

Features 

 Support for MJPEG and other Intra-frame Editing Codecs  
 Client/server architecture
 Live editing
 Live recording 
 Frame accurate
 Loop-based editing (Video sampling).
 Trick play
 Non-destructive editing
 Native YUV processing
 Support for video capture devices
 Slow motion
 More than 140 built-in realtime effects
 Effect chaining
 Support for Frei0r
 Support for interpolation of effect parameters
 Realtime mixing of video (Overlay, Chroma Keying, Blending, Transitions)
 Dynamic Frame rate
 Support for audio through JACK Audio Connection Kit
 Support for Multitrack
 Remote control via Open Sound Control, MIDI and Veejay's own protocol VIMS
 Support for Vloopback
 Almost all functions can be controlled with the keyboard or MIDI controller
 Configurable video window placement
 Support for realtime audio time stretching and pitch scaling
 Macro recording and playback
 MIDI learning
 Crash recovery

See also

List of video editing software
Comparison of video editing software

References

External links
 Official website
 
 Source code repository

Free video software
Video editing software
Live video software
Free software programmed in C
Visual music
Video art